Rembrandt lighting is a standard lighting technique that is used in studio portrait photography and cinematography; it is also used in contrast with butterfly lighting It can be achieved using one light and a reflector, or two lights, and is popular because it is capable of producing images which appear both natural and compelling with a minimum of equipment. Rembrandt lighting is characterized by an illuminated triangle (also called "Rembrandt patch") under the eye of the subject on the less illuminated side of the face. It is named for the Dutch painter Rembrandt, who occasionally used this type of lighting.

Description

Normally, the key light is placed high and to one side at the front, and the fill light or a reflector is placed half-height and on the other side at the front, set to about half the power of the key light, with the subject, if facing at an angle to the camera, with the key light illuminating the far side of the face. The key in Rembrandt lighting is creating the triangle or diamond shape of light underneath the eye. One side of the face is lit well from the main light source while the other side of the face uses the interaction of shadows and light, also known as chiaroscuro, to create this geometric form on the face. The triangle should be no longer than the nose and no wider than the eye. This technique may be achieved subtly or very dramatically by altering the distance between subject and lights and relative strengths of main and fill lights.

Origin of photographic term
Pioneering movie director Cecil B. DeMille is credited with the first use of the term. While shooting the 1915 film, The Warrens of Virginia, DeMille borrowed some portable spotlights from the Mason Opera House in downtown Los Angeles and "began to make shadows where shadows would appear in nature." When business partner Sam Goldwyn saw the film with only half an actor's face illuminated, he feared the exhibitors would pay only half the price for the picture. After DeMille told him it was Rembrandt lighting, "Sam’s reply was jubilant with relief: for Rembrandt lighting the exhibitors would pay double!"

Examples

References

Photographic lighting
Rembrandt
Art of the Dutch Golden Age
Dutch inventions